Pimenta ferruginea is a species of plant in the family Myrtaceae. It is endemic to Cuba.

References

Flora of Cuba
ferruginea
Endangered plants
Taxonomy articles created by Polbot